"Runaway Train" is a song by English musicians Elton John and Eric Clapton. A CD, cassette and 7-inch vinyl single from Elton John's album The One was released in July 1992 and was later accompanied by a music video shot the same year. It was also used in the Lethal Weapon 3 movie soundtrack.

Writing and recording
The music for the song was written by Elton John and Olle Romo while the lyrics were written by John's long-time collaborator Bernie Taupin. For the recording of his instrumental part, John used the Roland RD-1000 digital piano. Eric Clapton sings a duet with John for this track. Clapton takes the main singing part and improvised a couple guitar solos while recording. The song is in the key of G minor. For the studio recordings, Clapton used a capo on the third guitar fret, but never used it for live performances when John and Clapton went on tour in 1992.

Release and promotion
The song was released on 20 July 1992 as the second single of John's studio album, The One, and from the Lethal Weapon 3 soundtrack. Then, it was available for several European countries. A music video to accompany the single was released in late 1992. It consists of video snippets while Clapton and John are performing the song during the Eric Clapton World Tour in London's Wembley Stadium.

Track listings
Maxi-CD single
 "Runaway Train" – 5:23
 "Aretha & Elton – Through The Storm" – 4:21
 "George Michael & Elton John – Don't Let The Sun Go Down On Me" – 5:49
 "Elton John & Cliff Richard – Slow Rivers" – 3:10

7-inch vinyl single
 "Runaway Train" – 5:23
 "Elton John – Understanding Women" – 9:31

Personnel
Personnel are taken from the single release liner notes.

 Eric Clapton – lead guitar · lead vocals
 Elton John – keyboards · lead vocals
 Olle Romeo – drums · percussion · programming

 Davey Johnstone – rhythm guitar
 Guy Babylon – keyboards · programming
 Pino Palladino – bass guitar

 Janice Jamison – backing vocals
 Carole Fredericks – backing vocals
 Beckie Bell – backing vocals

Charts

Weekly charts

Year-end charts

Certifications

References

1992 singles
Eric Clapton songs
Elton John songs
MCA Records singles
1992 songs
Lethal Weapon (franchise)
Songs with music by Elton John
Songs with lyrics by Bernie Taupin
The Rocket Record Company singles
Male vocal duets